is a passenger railway station in located in the city of Neyagawa, Osaka Prefecture, Japan, operated by the private railway company Keihan Electric Railway. One notable feature of this station is that it has a large camphor sacred tree growing in the middle of it which is considered sacred to the local people. The station was built around it. The tree is estimated to be around 700 years old; its base has a small Shinto shrine.

Lines
Kayashima Station is served by the  Keihan Main Line, and is located 12.8 km from the starting point of the line at Yodoyabashi Station.

Station layout
The station has two island platforms connected by an elevated station building.

Platforms

Adjacent stations

History
The station was opened on April 15, 1910.

Passenger statistics
In fiscal 2019, the station was used by an average of 27,841 passengers daily.

Surrounding area
 Kayashima Shrine
Kayashima Ikuno Hospital

References

External links

Official home page 

Railway stations in Japan opened in 1910
Railway stations in Osaka Prefecture
Neyagawa, Osaka